"Crabbuckit" is a single by Canadian hip hop musician k-os, released in 2004 as the first single from his album Joyful Rebellion, and is the fourth track on the album. The title and work refers to the crab in the bucket syndrome where a group of crabs will pull down any crab that tries to escape, thereby ensuring their collective demise.

The song won the Juno Award for Single of the Year at the Juno Awards of 2005, and was the first hip hop song ever to win the Juno in that category.

Music video
k-os walks down streets in Toronto, wearing sunglasses that allow him to see individual people who are crabs in disguise and he performs in a club. Both Nelly Furtado and Red1 (from Rascalz) make a brief cameo appearance in the music video. Nelly Furtado can be seen playing guitar in front of a house block and Red1 can be seen in the bar sitting beside k-os.

Chart performance

The single reached number 23 on the Canadian Singles Chart. The video also made No. 1 on the MuchMusic Countdown for two weeks in 2004. The song was also named the 37th greatest Canadian song of all time in the 2005 CBC Radio series 50 Tracks: The Canadian Version.

Peak chart positions

Covers
The song was covered by Canadian folk/country trio The Good Lovelies on their 2011 album Let the Rain Fall.

It was covered by the Canadian a capella quartet Cadence on their 2018 album "Home".

References

2004 singles
K-os songs
2004 songs
Astralwerks singles
Juno Award for Single of the Year singles